Inukjuak Airport  is located adjacent to Inukjuak, Quebec, Canada.

Airlines and destinations

References

External links

Certified airports in Nord-du-Québec